Pterigynandrum is a genus of mosses belonging to the family Pterigynandraceae.

The genus was first described by Johann Hedwig.

The genus has cosmopolitan distribution.

Species:
 Pterigynandrum filiforme Hedwig, 1801

References

Hypnales
Moss genera